Arthur Ochs Sulzberger Sr. (February 5, 1926 – September 29, 2012) was an American publisher and a businessman. Born into a prominent media and publishing family, Sulzberger became publisher of The New York Times in 1963 and chairman of the board of The New York Times Company in 1973. Sulzberger relinquished to his son, Arthur Ochs Sulzberger Jr., the office of publisher in 1992, and chairman of the board in 1997.

Early life and education 
Sulzberger was born to a Jewish family on February 5, 1926, in New York City, the son of Arthur Hays Sulzberger and Iphigene Bertha Ochs (daughter of Adolph Ochs, the former publisher and owner of The New York Times and the Chattanooga Times and granddaughter of Rabbi Isaac Mayer Wise). He had a sister named Judy, which gave rise to his nickname, "Punch", in reference to the British traditional puppet show, Punch and Judy.   Sulzberger  graduated from the Loomis Institute and then enlisted into the United States Marine Corps during World War II, serving from 1944 to 1946, in the Pacific Theater. He earned a B.A. degree in English and history in 1951 at Columbia University. As student, he roomed with composer Philip Springer in John Jay Hall. As a member of the Marine Forces Reserve he was recalled to active duty during the Korean War. Following completion of officer training, he saw duty in Korea and then in Washington, D.C., before being inactivated.

Publisher of The New York Times
Sulzberger became publisher of The New York Times in 1963, after the death of his sister Marian's husband, Orvil Dryfoos, who had been publisher for less than two years. Sulzberger was 37 at the time, the youngest publisher in Times history. Prior to Dryfoos, Sulzberger's father, Arthur Hays Sulzberger, and maternal grandfather, Adolph Ochs, were the publishers, and also the chairs of the board of The New York Times Company.

In the 1960s Sulzberger built a large news-gathering staff at The Times. He was its publisher when the newspaper won a Pulitzer Prize in 1972 for publishing The Pentagon Papers. He was elected a fellow of the American Academy of Arts and Sciences in 1988. His son Arthur Ochs Sulzberger Jr. succeeded him as the newspaper's publisher in 1992. Sulzberger remained chairman of The New York Times Company until October 1997.

Philanthropy 
In addition to his work at The New York Times, he also served as trustee from 1968 as well as chairman of the Metropolitan Museum of Art from 1987 to 1998. He was elected as a life trustee of Columbia University in 1967.

Personal life and death
Sulzberger was married three times. In 1948, he married Barbara Winslow Grant (of mostly Scottish and English heritage) in a civil ceremony at her parents' home in Purchase, New York. They had two children: Arthur Ochs Sulzberger Jr.; and Karen Alden Sulzberger (married to author Eric Lax); before divorcing in 1956.

In December 1956, he married Carol Fox Fuhrman; they had one daughter, Cynthia Fox Sulzberger Green, before his wife died in 1995. He also adopted Fox's daughter from a previous marriage, Cathy Sulzberger (married to Joseph George Perpich,). In 1996, he married Allison Stacey Cowles, widow of William H. Cowles, 3rd (died 1992), who was part of the Cowles family that owns The Spokesman-Review of Spokane, Washington.

In 2005, the Newspaper Association of America (NAA) honored Sulzberger with the Katharine Graham Lifetime Achievement Award. Sulzberger dedicated the Wellesley College pub, aptly named "Punch's Alley", in honor of his wife, Allison, a class of 1955 Wellesley alum.

Sulzberger died of a brain hemorrhage at his home on September 29, 2012. He was 86.

Publication of the Pentagon Papers
On June 13, 1971, The New York Times published the first of seven articles on the Pentagon Papers. According to Floyd Abrams, Sulzberger "made the call to accept the risks rather than those of silence", adding that "In retrospect, the decision may seem obvious, but it was by no means an easy one at the time, and it remains one for which Sulzberger deserves enormous credit."

References

Sources
 Behind the Times: Inside the New New York Times, by Edwin Diamond. Villard Books.
 The Trust: The Private and Powerful Family Behind The New York Times, by Alex S. Jones, Susan E. Tifft. Back Bay Books (2000), .

External links
Oral history interview with Arthur Ochs Sulzberger, 1998 Aug. 5- Oct. 14 from The Metropolitan Museum of Art Archives, New York.

1926 births
2012 deaths
20th-century American businesspeople
Jewish American military personnel
United States Marine Corps personnel of the Korean War
United States Marine Corps personnel of World War II
American newspaper publishers (people)
American people of German-Jewish descent
Columbia College (New York) alumni
Fellows of the American Academy of Arts and Sciences
Sulzberger family
The New York Times corporate staff
The New York Times publishers
United States Marine Corps officers
Loomis Chaffee School alumni
21st-century American Jews